Nikita Troitskiy (born 16 April 1999 in Ekenäs) is a Finnish-born Russian driver.

Career

Karting
Born in Ekenäs, Finland, but raised in St. Petersburg, Troitskiy competed in karting for a number of years after some encouragement from fellow countryman Robert Shwartzman.

Lower formulae
In 2015, Troitskiy graduated to single-seaters in the SMP F4 and French F4 Championships. He claimed a win and finished sixth in the former whilst finishing thirteenth in the latter.

Later that month, Troitskiy partook in the MRF Challenge and finished third overall.

Formula Renault 2.0 NEC
In 2016, Troitskiy switched to the sport with Fortec Motorsports. He finished thirteenth overall, with a podium in his first race.

Euroformula Open
Troitskiy also raced in two rounds of the Euroformula Open Championship with Drivex, claiming a pole and third place in the second race at Monza. 

The following year, Troitskiy reunited with Drivex to contest the series. He wasn't able to win, but finished as runner-up to Harrison Scott with nine podium finishes in the 18 races. In the final race of the season, Felipe Drugovich won the race, but was ineglible to score points and Nikita Troitskiy win the last race.

Racing record

Career summary

† As Troitskiy was a guest driver, he was ineligible for championship points.

Complete Euroformula Open Championship results 
(key) (Races in bold indicate pole position; races in italics indicate points for the fastest lap of top ten finishers)

Complete FIA Formula 3 European Championship results
(key) (Races in bold indicate pole position) (Races in italics indicate fastest lap)

References

External links
 

1999 births
Living people
Sportspeople from Saint Petersburg
Finnish racing drivers
Russian racing drivers
French F4 Championship drivers
MRF Challenge Formula 2000 Championship drivers
Formula Renault 2.0 NEC drivers
Euroformula Open Championship drivers
FIA Formula 3 European Championship drivers
Carlin racing drivers
SMP F4 Championship drivers
Koiranen GP drivers
Auto Sport Academy drivers
Drivex drivers
SMP Racing drivers
Fortec Motorsport drivers
JD Motorsport drivers
Formula Renault Eurocup drivers
People from Raseborg